is a Japanese TV personality and actress.

Films
  (1996), cashier
 Udon (2006)
  (2007), Saeko Hasegawa

TV
 Dempa Shōnen (電波少年) series (Nippon Television)
 Daisuki! (Nippon Television)
 TV Champion (TVチャンピオン) (TV Tokyo)
 Tsubasa (つばさ) (NHK, March 2009–)

References

External links
 Watanabe Entertainment agency profile 
 Official blog 
 

1966 births
Japanese actresses
Japanese impressionists (entertainers)
Living people
Musicians from Kagawa Prefecture
Watanabe Entertainment
People from Takamatsu, Kagawa